Micropilina wareni is a species of monoplacophoran, a superficially limpet-like marine mollusc. It is found off the coast of New Zealand.

References

Monoplacophora
Molluscs described in 2006